"I'll Always Love You" is a song by American singer Taylor Dayne and the third single from her debut album, Tell It to My Heart.  Dayne was nominated for a Grammy Award for Best Female R&B Vocal for her performance on "I'll Always Love You" in 1989. The song was also nominated for Best R&B Song that year.

Background
The song is a romantic ballad, showcasing Dayne's softer side—after the first two singles released were mainly freestyle, dance-pop tracks—paving her way to the adult contemporary charts.  It features sensuous love lyrics accompanied by a saxophone instrumental performed by Richie Cannata, who has played for other mainstream acts, including the Billy Joel Band.

Charts
This single was her first crossover hit, being her first song on the adult contemporary radio format and her only song to chart on the R&B chart. It reached number three on the Billboard Hot 100 during both of the weeks that "Don't Worry, Be Happy", by Bobby McFerrin, held the number-one spot (the weeks ending September 24 and October 1, 1988). "I'll Always Love You" stayed in the Hot 100 for 30 weeks, the longest time for any Hot 100 entry released in 1988. It also held the number-two spot on Billboard's Adult Contemporary Chart for two weeks, behind "One Good Woman", by Peter Cetera. "I'll Always Love You" was certified gold by the Recording Industry Association of America (RIAA).

Weekly charts

Year-end charts

Certifications

Covers
In 1988, Filipina singer Sharon Cuneta covered her version and featured on her comedy movie, Jack & Jill Sa America released by VIVA Entertainment in the Philippines.
In 1989, Tito Nieves Released a Salsa version which is on his album, Yo Quiero Cantar.

Popular culture
In 2012, Dayne performed this song live on This American Life, using it to serenade comedian Tig Notaro, who, every time she had previously encountered Dayne, used to greet her by saying, "Excuse me, I'm sorry to bother you, but I just have to tell you. I love your voice."

References

1988 singles
Taylor Dayne songs
Tito Nieves songs
Song recordings produced by Ric Wake
1988 songs
Arista Records singles
Contemporary R&B ballads
Pop ballads
1980s ballads